Edmilson de Carvalho Barbosa (born 5 May 1979 in Sao Paulo) is a Brazilian footballer who currently played for Federação de Futebol de Mato Grosso do Sul.

Playing career
De Carvalho began playing football at the youth level with São Paulo, and Corinthians, where he won the Copa São Paulo de Juniores.

Hamilton Thunder and Toronto Lynx
In 2004, De Carvalho went abroad to Canada to sign with the Hamilton Thunder for the 2004 CPSL season. He made his debut on 27 May 2004 in a match against the Metro Lions. In a short while he was able to establish himself into the first team, where he scored four goals in nine appearances. On 30 July he was loaned out along with Matthew O'Connor to a higher division to the Toronto Lynx of the USL First Division. He made his Lynx debut on 7 August against Virginia Beach Mariners. However De Carvalho struggled to establish himself within the Toronto squad due to only appearing in matches for 45 minutes even when listed as starters. Once the season came to a conclusion and the Lynx failed to reach the post season De Carvalho returned to the Thunder. He helped Hamilton to clinch their first Western Conference title, and led the Thunder to semi-finals where they were defeated by Toronto Croatia.

References

1979 births
Living people
Canadian Soccer League (1998–present) players
Brazilian footballers
Brazilian expatriate footballers
Association football midfielders
Hamilton Thunder players
Expatriate footballers in Germany
Toronto Lynx players
A-League (1995–2004) players
Expatriate footballers in Guatemala
Expatriate soccer players in Canada
Brazilian expatriate sportspeople in Canada
Brazilian expatriate sportspeople in Germany
Brazilian expatriate sportspeople in Guatemala
Berliner AK 07 players
FK Srem players
Serbian First League players
Expatriate footballers in Serbia
Footballers from São Paulo